Jean-Marie Constant Duhamel (5 February 1797 – 29 April 1872) was a French mathematician and physicist.

His studies were affected by the troubles of the Napoleonic era. He went on to form his own school École Sainte-Barbe. Duhamel's principle, a method of obtaining solutions to inhomogeneous linear evolution equations, is named after him. He was primarily a mathematician but did studies on the mathematics of heat, mechanics, and acoustics.  He also did work in calculus using infinitesimals. Duhamel's theorem for infinitesimals says that the sum of a series of infinitesimals is unchanged by replacing the infinitesimal with its principal part.

In 1843 he published about an early recording device he called a vibroscope. Like other similar devices, the vibroscope was a type of measuring device similar to an oscilloscope, and could not play back the etchings it recorded.

Honours 
 19617 Duhamel, asteroid named after him

See also
Duhamel two-point function
Raabe–Duhamel's test

References 

19th-century French mathematicians
French physicists
Members of the French Academy of Sciences
1797 births
1872 deaths